Best in the World 2012: Hostage Crisis was a professional wrestling Internet pay-per-view (iPPV) event produced by Ring of Honor (ROH) that took place on June 24, 2012 at the Hammerstein Ballroom in New York, New York.

Storylines
Best in the World 2012 featured professional wrestling matches involving different wrestlers from pre-existing scripted feuds, plots, and storylines that played out on Ring of Honor's (ROH) television programs. Wrestlers portrayed villains or heroes as they followed a series of events that built tension and culminated in a wrestling match or series of matches.

Results

References

External links
Official Best in the World 2012: Hostage Crisis page
Official Ring of Honor page

Ring of Honor pay-per-view events
Events in New York City
2012 in New York City
2012
Professional wrestling in New York City
June 2012 events in the United States
2012 Ring of Honor pay-per-view events